Viola Mae Wilkerson (December 30, 1939 – May 6, 2009), better known professionally as Viola Wills was an American pop and R&B singer, best known for her disco/dance/Hi-NRG covers of classics and other standards such as Patience and Prudence's "Gonna Get Along Without You Now" (1979), Gordon Lightfoot's "If You Could Read My Mind" (1980), The Drifters' "Up on the Roof" (1980), "Always Something There To Remind Me" by Burt Bacharach and Hal David (1980), the Doris Day single "Secret Love" (1980), Chicago's "If You Leave Me Now" (1981) and Joni Mitchell's "Both Sides Now" (1986). She also recorded one of the very few dance versions of the Burt Bacharach and Hal David classic "A House Is Not a Home" (1994) - which is a completely different song from the similarly titled "House Is Not a Home" by Deborah Cox.

Her cover of the Harold Arlen and Ted Koehler torch song "Stormy Weather" peaked at #4 on the Billboard U.S. Hot Dance Club Play charts in 1982, the highest position the song has reached since Billboard began tracking music sales in 1947, although the original 1933 version sung by Ethel Waters at the Cotton Club in Harlem and later, the early 1940s rendition by Lena Horne sold quite well and became much better known.

Early career
Born Viola Mae Wilkerson in the Watts district of South Los Angeles, Wills was married in her teens. She was the mother of six children before the age of 21. In 1965, she was discovered by Barry White who signed her to Bronco Records and renamed her with the shorter stage surname of Wills; from her first marriage name of Lyons. She started her career at the Los Angeles Conservatory of Music and, over the following years, in addition to working with White, also performed with Joe Cocker, Smokey Robinson and many other established recording artists of the era. It was while working in London as one of Cocker's backing vocalists (dubbed the "Sanctified Sisters") that she worked on and released her solo debut album of self-penned originals titled Soft Centers, backed by Cocker's session players.

Later career
Wills' first major break into the mainstream came in 1979 with her cover version of "Gonna Get Along Without Ya Now" (the song's release date was May 14, 1979) which started a string of dance hits. All three of the songs landed Wills in the Guinness Book of British Hit Singles. In 1982, her cover of "Stormy Weather" peaked at number 4 in the U.S. Hot Dance Club Play chart. Later in 1983, the newly formed record label RVA (Robert Viola Ashmun), released a number of songs, including "Wall", "Space" and "If These Walls Could Speak".

A demand for 1980s music brought Wills back to Europe. She appeared on Top of the Pops (October 11, 1979), Pebble Mill, Soul Train (October 30, 1971 [Season 1, Episode 5] where she performed the song "Sweetback"), Later... with Jools Holland, Ronnie Scott's, Never Mind the Buzzcocks (February 17, 2003 [Season 12, Episode 7]). Wills had a residency at Joogleberry Playhouse in Brighton. Here she was backed on occasion by Brighton based pianist Tom Phelan and jazz guitarist Shane Hill. She also appeared with the soul fusion band Gonzalez.

Although Wills did not have a mainstream U.S hit she was popular among the nation's gay community and her singles were popular in dance clubs. A number of her recordings are found on various compilations. Thes songs include "No News Is News", "A House Is Not a Home", "If You Could Read My Mind", "Up on the Roof", "Somebody's Eyes", "Love Pains", "Let's Love Now", "Take One Step Forward" (by Wills and Noel McCalla), and "Always Something There to Remind Me". Her vocals also featured on My Friend Sam's 1992 house track "It's My Pleasure" which later appeared on the Renaissance: The Mix Collection (1994).

Personal life and death
On February 21, 1982 in Hennepin County, Minnesota; she married Robert Chappell Ashmun. This was her second marriage. Later in 1983, the new husband and wife pair formed the record label RVA (Robert Viola Ashmun).

Wills died of cancer on May 6, 2009 in Phoenix, Arizona. Her funeral was held at the Macedonia Abbey Baptist Church in Los Angeles on May 15, 2009.

Viola left behind six children - Vincent, Christopher, Regina, Ladonna, David and Rejal, 21 grandchildren and eight great grandchildren.

Discography

Albums

Compilations

Singles

References

External links
 
 
 
 Viola Wills at Soul Walking

1939 births
2009 deaths
20th-century American women singers
American women pop singers
American dance musicians
People from Watts, Los Angeles
Singers from Los Angeles
Deaths from cancer in Arizona
Gonzalez (band) members
Hansa Records artists
20th-century American singers
21st-century American women